is a national highway of Japan connecting Ōmachi City and Matsumoto City in Japan.

Route data
Length: 31.4 km (19.5 mi)
Origin: Ōmachi City (originates at junction with Route 148)
Terminus: Matsumoto City (ends at Junction with Route 19, Route 254)
Major cities: Azumino City

History
1953-05-18 - Second Class National Highway 147 (from Ōmachi to Matsumoto)
1965-04-01 - General National Highway 147

References
 

147
Roads in Nagano Prefecture